larswm is a window manager for the X window system that follows the tiling window manager paradigm.  Using ideas from the older 9wm window manager, it features automatic tiling and virtual desktops.  It also borrows other ideas, for example a limited form of plumbing, from the Acme development environment.  Objects are tiled into non-overlapping areas, instead of using windows that can be stacked, as this approach can result in lower memory and CPU requirements.

See also 
 dwm
 wmii
 Ratpoison
 Desktop metaphor

References 
 Georg F.C. Reeve Larswm, Brave GNU World, issue 26, also appeared in Linux Magazine, Sep 2001, pp. 108–109
 Nicholas Petreley (Jul 9, 2002) Window-managers 101: The desktop beyond GNOME and KDE SYS-CON, originally appeared in  LinuxWorld.com

External links 
 larswm homepage mirror
 
 A collation of larswm resources

Free X window managers
Tiling window managers
Discontinued software